Paul van Haver (born 12 March 1985), better known by his stage name Stromae, is a Belgian singer, rapper, songwriter and producer. He is mostly known for his music blending hip hop,electronic music and French Music. Stromae came to wide public attention in 2009 with his song "Alors on danse" (from the album Cheese), which became a number one in several European countries. In 2013, his second album Racine carrée was a commercial success, selling 2 million copies in France. The main singles from the album include "Papaoutai" and "Formidable".

Early life
Paul van Haver was born in Brussels and raised in the city's Laken district, to a Rwandan Tutsi father, Pierre Rutare, and a Flemish mother, Miranda van Haver. He said in an interview that he also has Somali heritage from his father's side. He and his siblings were raised by their mother, as his father, an architect, was killed during the 1994 Rwandan genocide, while visiting his family. He attended the Sacré-coeur de Jette, a Jesuit school in Jette, the Collège Saint-Paul in Godinne, after failing in the public school system at the age of 16. He formed a small rap group with his friends while still in school. His early influences included Belgian singer-songwriter Jacques Brel, son cubano and Congolese rumba.

Career

2000–2007: Early career
In 2000, Stromae appeared as a rapper called Opsmaestro, though he later changed his stage name to "Stromae", which is "Maestro" with the syllables reversed following the French slang practice, verlan.

At the age of 18, he founded a rap group called "Suspicion", along with rapper "J.E.D.I." in Eichhof. They produced the song and music video "Faut que t'arrête le Rap..." before J.E.D.I. decided to leave the rap duo. To finance his private school education, Van Haver worked part-time in the hospitality industry, but his academic performance was not up to standard. It was only later, when he registered at the Institut national de radioélectricité et cinématographie, that he released his first EP "Juste un cerveau, un flow, un fond et un mic...".

2007–2008: Debut EP and record career
In 2007, during his studies at the film school of Brussels, Stromae decided to concentrate fully on his musical career. This resulted in his debut-EP "Juste un cerveau, un flow, un fond et un mic…". In 2008, he signed a four-year record deal with "Because Music" and "Kilomaître".

2008–2012: Breakthrough and international success
In 2008, Stromae worked as a young trainee at the music radio station NRJ in Brussels. Vincent Verbelen, Music Manager, was impressed by the talent he perceived in Stromae's first single "Alors on danse" and decided to air it for the first time on NRJ.

Vertigo Records, a label of Mercury Records France (Universal Music Group), signed him for a worldwide licensing deal soon after this.

By May 2010 the track "Alors on danse" had reached number one in Belgium, France, Sweden, Greece, Germany, Austria, Turkey, Switzerland, Italy, Denmark, Romania and the Czech Republic.

On 2 September, Stromae collaborated with Kanye West and Gilbere Forte in a remix of his hit "Alors on danse". In 2010, he was nominated for Best Dutch and Belgian Act at the MTV Europe Music Awards.

He is one of the ten winners of the European Border Breakers Award 2011. On 9 February 2011, his debut album Cheese (including the hit single "Alors on danse") won the award for Best Dance Album at the Victoires de la musique.

On 23 May 2011, during the recording of the French TV show Taratata, Stromae did a mashup of "Alors on danse" and "Don't Stop the Party" with the Black Eyed Peas. Stromae also announced he would perform as the opening support act for the first of two concerts by the band in Paris on 24 and 25 June 2011 at Stade de France.

In 2011, he received one nomination for Best Belgian Act at the MTV Europe Music Awards.

2013–2017: Racine carrée

The first single "Papaoutai" from his second album Racine carrée (Square root) was digitally released on 13 May 2013. It went on to chart number 1 in Belgium and France, number 2 in the Netherlands, as well as number 7 in Germany and Switzerland.

On 22 May 2013, amateur-looking videos appeared on YouTube showing Stromae, apparently drunk and wandering at the Louise tram station in Brussels at dawn. The videos went viral. A few days later, it was revealed that this was linked with the filming of a professional music video. This was confirmed during an appearance by Stromae on the French TV show Ce soir ou jamais in which he discussed and also performed his new single "Formidable", which is about the story of a drunk man just separated from his girlfriend. The music video was made from edited hidden-camera footage taken on 22 May. It also shows people taking pictures with their cellphones, people who are clearly irritated by his drunk actions, people helping him stand up, and three policemen asking if the artist was okay or if he needed some help. The policemen were criticised for not disciplining the drunk Stromae; however, they later said the full story had not been shown. The part where they returned and Stromae had to explain his case was not broadcast.

On 26 July 2013, Stromae announced on his Facebook and Twitter accounts that he had completed his second studio album Racine carrée or √ and that it would be released on 16 August 2013. On 25 August 2013, Stromae joined Major Lazer's show at French festival Rock en Seine, where he performed "Papaoutai". In September 2013, Belgian rock band Mintzkov covered his song "Formidable" for a live session on Studio Brussel, with lyrics in English. In November 2013, Stromae received the award for Best Belgian Act at the MTV Europe Music Awards.

On 22 February 2014, he performed his song "Formidable" as a guest at the Sanremo Music Festival in Italy.

On 17 March 2014, it was made public that Stromae's song "Ta fête" would become the official song for the Belgium national team at the 2014 FIFA World Cup.

In June 2014, in support of Racine carrée, Stromae made his US television debut on NBC's Late Night with Seth Meyers. He then embarked on a tour across the United States and performed at the Best Buy Theater in New York City. While in New York, on 22 June 2014, Stromae guest-starred in a Snapchat story with Jérôme Jarre as The Carrot's Father.

On 21 October 2014, it was revealed that New Zealand singer Lorde invited Stromae to work on the soundtrack for The Hunger Games: Mockingjay – Part 1 along with artists like Kanye West, Grace Jones, Diplo and The Chemical Brothers. He contributed to the song "Meltdown" which also features Pusha T, Q-Tip, Haim and Lorde herself. The singer had declared herself a fan of Stromae after attending his concert earlier that month. In March 2015, Stromae released a music video for the song "Carmen", which was directed by Sylvain Chomet. The video warns people against the addictive qualities of social media apps such as Twitter.

Stromae continued touring the United States, performing in March 2015 in several places including the SXSW in Austin, Texas. He was also among the line-up of the Coachella Valley Music and Arts Festival. He then began a tour in Africa on 13 May. However, in mid-June Stromae was forced to cancel the remaining of his shows until 2 August for health reasons. He performed at Madison Square Garden in October, becoming the first exclusively French-singing performer to sell out that venue.

On 14 September 2015, Stromae released a single "Quand c'est?", a song about cancer, which plays on the fact that "Quand c'est?" (When is it?) and "cancer" are phonetically similar in French.

2018–present: New work and Multitude

On 6 April 2018, Stromae released his first single in more than three years, "Défiler", to accompany the release of "Capsule 5" a new fashion line. The song was co-composed with his brother, Luc Junior Tam. The song's lyrics play on the meanings in the French language of the words "défiler" ("to parade/pass by", often used to refer to models walking down a runway), "fil" (thread, line) and "filer" (to whizz by), evoking themes of modeling and superficiality; of life speeding by; and of toeing the line or hanging by a thread.

In 2019, he co-produced and provided vocals, in French, for the song "Arabesque" of the band Coldplay, for their album Everyday Life.

On 10 November 2020, during his first Live Instagram on the occasion of Mosaert's 10th anniversary, he mentioned working on new music.
Finally, on 15 October 2021 his first single in three years, named "Santé", was released. When asked during a 2022 interview whether "Santé" is about workers during the COVID-19 pandemic he said, "No, not exactly." Stromae explained that he wrote the song about Rosa, the woman who cleans his house, and that the song is about celebrating people who "are just working while we are partying". It is also now identified by a dance Stromae made up specifically for the song, which can be seen in the music video. On 8 December 2021, he announced that his third studio album, Multitude, would be released on 4 March 2022.

On 9 January 2022, he unveiled a second single from the album, "L'enfer", by performing it live during the 8 pm TV news on TF1.

Collaborations 
In 2009, Stromae collaborated with Kery James on the song "Ghetto", also featuring J-mi Sissoko. The song was the subject of his "Lesson Number 14" series on YouTube.

In 2010, Stromae's song "Alors on danse" was remixed by Kanye West. Stromae brought West on stage at Coachella in 2015 while he performed the song.

Stromae collaborated with Lorde, Haim, Pusha T, and Q-Tip for the song "Meltdown", which uses the instrumental of his song "Merci", a track originally recorded for his 2014 album Racine carrée. The track was featured on the soundtrack for the film The Hunger Games: Mockingjay – Part 1.

Stromae collaborated with director Henry Scholfield to produce the music video for English artist Dua Lipa's single "IDGAF". The video was released on 12 January 2018.

Stromae provided vocals for Coldplay's 2019 single "Arabesque" on their eighth studio album, Everyday Life.

Stromae also collaborated with French rapper Orelsan on a song called "La pluie".

Stromae collaborated with Camila Cabello in the music video for "Mon amour", where she contributed vocals in English and French for the video version in 2022.

Other ventures
The name "Stromae" comes from switching the syllables in the word "maestro". This inversion is a result of French slang known as verlan.

Stromae launched a fashion line, Mosaert (an anagram of his stage name), described as "hipster" and "retro kitsch". Stromae has said that he wanted to "create a bridge between British style and African aesthetic". The first collection was a success, with stocks almost sold out after three days. The second collection, Capsule No. 2, was released at Colette in Paris on 3 December 2014, and features the square root design on each item in different colors. Capsule No. 3 was released on 7 April 2016, a music track was released on 31 March 2017 to promote the line. The new designs are the first to use patterns not previously worn by Stromae, reflecting Mosaert's intention to gradually move into a separate stylistic identity for the clothing line.

On 6 April 2018, Mosaert presented a fashion show at Le Bon Marché Rive Gauche in Paris to mark the release of its latest collection, "Capsule n°5", which was accompanied by the release of Stromae's first new single in more than five years, "Défiler".

Personal life
In 2015, Stromae had to cancel a tour through Africa because of anxiety caused by the malaria medicine Lariam (Mefloquine). Since then he had avoided public appearances. In an interview in 2017, he stated that he still suffers from panic attacks and initially left open whether he would ever be able to make music professionally again.

On 12 December 2015, Van Haver was secretly married to Coralie Barbier by Catholic priest Guy Gilbert, in a private ceremony held in Mechelen. The couple's first child was born in 2018.

Musical style 
Stromae's music is heavily influenced by electronic music, especially Belgian New Beat music. He has been touted as the "face of the New Beat generation". He also considers Congolese music to be a huge influence.

Stromae has been compared to Jacques Brel, whom Stromae considers a big influence, with Stromae covering several of his songs.

Awards and nominations

Discography

Studio albums
 Cheese (2010)
 Racine carrée (2013)
 Multitude (2022)

References

External links

 
 
 
 Scott Sayare, "Stromae: Disillusion, With a Dance Beat", The New York Times, 14 October 2013.

 
1985 births
21st-century Belgian singers
21st-century rappers
Belgian people of Rwandan descent
Belgian people of Somalian descent
Belgian rappers
Belgian singer-songwriters
French-language singers of Belgium
Hip hop singers
Living people
MTV Europe Music Award winners
People from Etterbeek
People of Flemish descent
Tutsi people
World Music Awards winners